The 1935 Tour de France was the 29th edition of the Tour de France, one of cycling's Grand Tours. The Tour began in Paris with a flat stage on 4 July, and Stage 13a occurred on 18 July with a flat stage from Marseille. The race finished in Paris on 28 July.

Stage 13a
18 July 1935 – Marseille to Nîmes,

Stage 13b
18 July 1935 – Nîmes to Montpellier,  (ITT)

Stage 14a
19 July 1935 – Montpellier to Narbonne,

Stage 14b
19 July 1935 – Narbonne to Perpignan,  (ITT)

Stage 15
20 July 1935 – Perpignan to Luchon,

Rest day 3
21 July 1935 – Luchon

Stage 16
22 July 1935 – Luchon to Pau,

Rest day 4
23 July 1935 – Pau

Stage 17
16 July 1935 – Pau to Bordeaux,

Stage 18a
25 July 1935 – Bordeaux to Rochefort,

Stage 18b
25 July 1935 – Rochefort to La Rochelle,  (ITT)

Stage 19a
26 July 1935 – La Rochelle to La Roche-sur-Yon,

Stage 19b
26 July 1935 – La Roche-sur-Yon to Nantes,  (ITT)

Stage 20a
27 July 1935 – Nantes to Vire,

Stage 20b
27 July 1935 – Vire to Caen,  (ITT)

Stage 21
28 July 1935 – Caen to Paris,

References

1935 Tour de France
Tour de France stages